Culicini is a tribe of mosquitoes in the subfamily Culicinae.

References

External links 
 
 

Culicinae
Nematocera tribes